Mahanayaka (also spelled as Maha Nayaka, Maha Nayake) theros are high-ranking Buddhist monks who oversee and regulate the Buddhist clergy in Theravada Buddhist countries. The title Maha Nayaka translates to English as 'Great Leader' and it is considered to be a very important position held by a monk in a Theravada Buddhist country. It is usually bestowed upon the senior Buddhist monks who are appointed the chief prelates of monastic fraternities known as Nikayas.

Sri Lankan tradition
In Sri Lankan Buddhist tradition, the title Mahanayaka is held by the heads of the chapters of all three main sects, Siam Nikaya (Estd. 1753), Amarapura Nikaya (Estd. 1803) and Ramanna Nikaya (Estd. 1864). Appointment of senior Buddhist monks to the Mahanayaka position in Sri Lanka began with the re-establishment of Upasampada higher ordination in 1753 on the initiatives taken by Sangharaja Weliwita Sri Saranankara Thero during the reign of king Kirti Sri Rajasinha of Kandy. The deputies of mahanayaka theros are known as Anunayaka theros (also spelled as Anu Nayaka), who generally succeed to the Mahanayaka position, after a death of an incumbent monk. Next in the hierarchy are Chief Sanghanayaka theros (also spelled as Sangha Nayaka), who have the jurisdiction over monks in a region, province or a district, while the Nayaka theros have the precedence in a temple or a group of connected temples. Prominent Mahanayake theros who are presently in office and their immediate predecessors are listed below.

Present Mahanayaka theros

 Most Ven. Thibbatuwawe Sri Siddhartha Sumangala Thero -  Mahanayaka of the Malwatta chapter of Siyam Nikaya
 Most Ven. Warakagoda Sri Gnanarathana Thero -  Mahanayaka of the Asgiriya chapter of Siyam Nikaya
 Most Ven. Makkulawe Wimala Thero -  Mahanayaka of Sri Lanka Ramanna Nikaya
 Most Ven. Dodampahala Chandrasiri Thero - Supreme Mahanayaka of Amarapura Nikaya
 Most Ven. Ittapane Dhammalankara Thera - Mahanayaka of the Kotte Sri Kalyani Samagri Dharma Mahasangha Sabha of Siyam Nikaya
 Most Ven. Thrikunamale Ananda Thero - Mahanayaka of the Dharmarakshitha Chapter of Amarapura Nikaya

Former Mahanayaka theros
 Most Ven. Kotugoda Dhammawasa Thera - Former Supreme Mahanayaka of Amarapura Nikaya
 Most Ven. Napana Pemasiri Thera - Former Mahanayaka of the Sri Lanka Ramanna Nikaya
 Most Ven. Galagama Sri Aththadassi Thera -  Mahanayaka of the Asgiriya Chapter of Siyam Nikaya.
 Most Ven. Udugama Sri Buddharakkitha Thero - Former Mahanayaka of the Asgiriya Chapter of Siyam Nikaya
 Most Ven. Rambukwelle Sri Vipassi Thera - Former Mahanayake of the Malwatta Chapter of Siyam Nikaya
 Most Ven. Davuldena Sri Gnanissara Thero - Former Supreme Mahanayaka of Amarapura Nikaya
 Most Ven. Weweldeniye Medhalankara Thero - Former Mahanayake of the Sri Lanka Ramanna Nikaya
 Most Ven. Sri Piyaratana Tissa Mahanayake Thero - Former Mahanayaka Thero of the Amarapura Nikaya (circa 1860s), and Former Sanganayake of the Southern Province. 

 Most Ven. Bellana Sri Gnanawimala Thera - Former Mahanayaka of the Kotte Sri Kalyani Samagri Dharma Mahasangha Sabha of Siyam Nikaya
 Most Ven. Weligama Sri Gnanaratana Thera - Former Mahanayaka of the Dharmarakshitha Chapter of Amarapura Nikaya

Privileges
The Mahanayaka theros of the Malwatta chapter and Asgiriya Chapter were traditionally referred by the Sri Lankan Government as the head of the Buddhist clergy in the country. As such certain state privileges have been extended since Sri Lanka gained independence in 1948. These include state provisions for official residences (aramayas), official vehicles and state funerals. With the formation of Supreme Mahanayaka post of Amarapura nikaya in 1969, state patronage has been extended to the Mahanayaka theros of the other nikayas as well.

See also
 Agga Maha Pandita
 Buddhism in Sri Lanka
 Sangharaja
 Sangha Supreme Council
 State Saṅgha Mahā Nāyaka Committee
 Supreme Patriarch of Thailand
 Supreme Patriarch of Cambodia
 Thathanabaing of Burma
 Diyawadana Nilame of Sri Dalada Maligawa, Kandy

References

External links
 Past Mahanayaka Theros in order (Asgiriya Chapter)
 Past Mahanayaka Theros in order (Malwatta Chapter)

Buddhist titles
Theravada